Grace 'Clara' Stone (12 January 1860 – 10 May 1957) was one of the first two women to graduate with honours in medicine at the University of Melbourne in 1891. She was named the first president of the Victorian Medical Women's Society, being elected in 1895, when the Society was founded. Dr. Stone was also one of three founders of the Queen Victoria Hospital, the first hospital in Australia founded by women, for women.

Her sister, Constance Stone, was the first woman to practice medicine in Australia.

Awards 
Stone was inducted onto the Victorian Honour Roll of Women in 2007.

References

Australian general practitioners
1860 births
1957 deaths